The Fourth Battle of the Isonzo was fought between  the armies of Kingdom of Italy and those of Austria-Hungary on the Italian Front in World War I, between 10 November and 2 December 1915.

Overview
In contrast to the previous three Battles of the Isonzo (June, July and October), this offensive lasted a short amount of time, and is sometimes considered a continuation of the previous offensive.

Most of the clash was concentrated in the direction of Gorizia and on the Kras Plateau, though the push was distributed on the whole Isonzo front. The Italian Second Army, aiming for the town of Gorizia, was able to capture the hilly area around Oslavia and San Floriano del Collio overlooking the Soča (Isonzo) and Gorizia itself. The Italian Third Army, covering the rest of the front up to the sea, launched a series of large and bloody attacks which brought no significant gain.

Mount Sei Busi, already the scene of bitter fighting, was attacked five times by the Italian forces, always in vain.

The intensity of the fighting increased until the end of November, when the bridgehead of Tolmin (Italian: Tolmino) was heavily bombed by both sides and the casualty ratio per day reached its apex. In the first fifteen days of December, however, the fighting was reduced to small scale skirmishes as opposed to the massive frontal assaults that characterized the previous phases of the battle.

An unsigned truce arrived together with the first great cold in the mountains of the Kras, and operations were ceased due to lack of supplies.

The Austro-Hungarian High Command, worried by the huge losses, requested assistance from the German Empire, which was not yet formally in the war against Italy. This would eventually lead to German intervention on the Italian front starting with the Eleventh Battle of the Isonzo.

See also
Battles of the Isonzo
Scipio Slataper

References

Further reading
Macdonald, John, and Željko Cimprič. Caporetto and the Isonzo Campaign: The Italian Front, 1915-1918. Barnsley, South Yorkshire: Pen & Sword Military, 2011.

External links
FirstWorldWar.Com: The Battles of the Isonzo, 1915-17
Battlefield Maps: Italian Front
11 battles at the Isonzo
The Walks of Peace in the Soča Region Foundation. The Foundation preserves, restores and presents the historical and cultural heritage of the First World War in the area of the Isonzo Front for the study, tourist and educational purposes.
The Kobarid Museum (in English)
Društvo Soška Fronta (in Slovenian)
Pro Hereditate - extensive site (in En/It/Sl)

Isonzo 04
Isonzo 04
Isonzo 04
Isonzo 04
the Isonzo
1915 in Italy
1915 in Austria-Hungary
November 1915 events
December 1915 events